

Cook Island Aquatic Reserve is a marine protected area located in the South Pacific Ocean, located around Cook Island about  from the Fingal Head mainland of New South Wales.

It was declared on 23 October 1998 under the state's Fisheries Management Act 1994.

The aquatic reserve consists of two zones – one extending from Mean High Water Mark on the island to a "boundary defined by five marker buoys" where fishing is prohibited and another extending from the "marker bouys" to the outer boundary of the aquatic reserve where fishing is permitted.

The waters within the aquatic reserve are used for recreational activities including swimming, boating and diving.  Thirteen moorings have been located within the aquatic reserve for use by boats to eliminate the need to anchor and therefore minimise damage to the seabed.

The aquatic reserve contains a wide variety of fish species, anemonefish, bullseyes, groupers, leatherjackers, parrotfish, pufferfish, surgeonfish, sweetlips and trevally. It also has a mass of additional species, including brittle stars, flatworms, shrimps, nudibranchs, and is frequented by migratory shark species, blind sharks (Brachaelurus waddi), leopard sharks (Stegostoma semifasciatum) and wobbegongs. Other native animals include crustaceans, green turtles, jellyfish, molluscs and stingrays. It hosts diverse fauna and has been noted in 2009 by Tweed Shire Council's Coast and Waterways Officer, Tom Alletson as an important habitat of sharks.

As of 2016, the aquatic reserve had been classified under International Union for Conservation of Nature system of protected area categories with the no-fishing zone is IUCN Category II and the line fishing only zone is IUCN Category IV.

See also
Cook Island Nature Reserve
Protected areas of New South Wales

References

External links
Official webpage
Webpage on the Protected Planet webpage

Tweed Heads, New South Wales
Tweed Shire
IUCN Category II
IUCN Category IV
Marine protected areas of New South Wales
Protected areas established in 1998
1998 establishments in Australia